Pueblo is a Puerto Rican supermarkets chain. It has been one of Puerto Rico's major supermarket chains since 1955.

History
The brainchild of brothers Harold Toppel and George Toppel, sons of Russian immigrant parents, Pueblo began as a single store operation on Roosevelt Avenue in the Puerto Nuevo section of San Juan, Puerto Rico. The success of the first store led the Toppels to open 43 other Pueblo Supermarkets around the Island and, by 1960, to convert the enterprise into a public company that began trading on the New York Stock Exchange.

In 1963, Pueblo expanded beyond Puerto Rico's shores to the US Virgin Islands. Pueblo opened stores in St. Thomas and St. Croix.

The company also introduced the trademark Pueblo which included items from paper towels to rice.

In 1983, Pueblo launched the Xtra Super Food Centers concept, a discount warehouse supermarket which allowed the customer to shop for groceries in a larger store format featuring lower prices with stores located in Puerto Rico and the state of Florida.  The lower prices were made possible by the elimination of some services, such as baggers. In 1989, Pueblo acquired the franchise rights to develop Blockbuster Video Stores in Puerto Rico and the US Virgin Islands. The first Blockbuster Video store opened in Puerto Rico in June 27, 1990 at Campo Rico Avenue in Carolina, next to the Administration Office and Distribution Center.

Bankruptcy
In 2003, Pueblo faced financial troubles and there were rumors of a potential buyer from Venezuela. Despite this, Pueblo's management remained optimistic about the company's future.
In 2007, Pueblo faced serious financial difficulties again, as many locations were sold to other competitors. Some were acquired and taken over by rival supermarkets Econo, Grande, COOP and Supermax.

Bidding and Pueblo, Inc. (f/k/a as PS Acquisition)

The entire chain was auctioned in September 2007 as part of the Chapter 11 Bankruptcy process, where a bid by Ramón Calderón president of Holsum of Puerto Rico (a baker goods company) for $139 million succeeded in taking over the rest of its operations. The Bankruptcy Court in Delaware approved the transaction. The new company expected to restructure Pueblo in an effort to revive the brand.

In September, 2009 Pueblo, Inc. sold its flagship store in Campo Rico Avenue, Carolina (next to their Corporate Headquarters and Distribution Center) to Econo Supermarkets.

In April 2012, Pueblo acquired two former Supermercados Selectos stores in Southeast Puerto Rico and converted them into Pueblo, in Arroyo and Guayama.
 
In February, 2014, Pueblo opened a new store in Ciudadela, Santurce.

In May, 2016, Pueblo relocated their Monte Mall store in Hato Rey from the first level of the Mall to the second one facing Luis Muñoz Rivera Ave. on a bigger space of 34,000 sq. feet incorporating the Village concept.

Pueblo Supermarkets acquisition of Amigo Supermarkets

In June 2022, Pueblo Supermarkets announced that it would be buying the 11 Amigo Supermarkets from Walmart, the name would stay and the 1,100 employees would keep their jobs. On August 26, 2022, the transition from Amigo to Pueblo supermarkets began, and it is possible that stores would be closed until the transition from Walmart to Pueblo was completed.

See also
 List of supermarket chains

References

External links
Official website

1955 establishments in Puerto Rico
Puerto Rican brands
Retail companies established in 1955
Supermarkets of Puerto Rico